A list of films produced by the Ollywood film industry and released in theaters in 2016.

References

Lists of Ollywood films by year